The Hazur Sahib Nanded–Amritsar Superfast Express is an express train belonging to Northern Railway zone that runs between  and  in India. It is currently being operated with 12421/12422 train numbers on a weekly basis.

Service

The 12421/Hazur Sahib Nanded–Amritsar SuperFast Express has an average speed of 55 km/hr and covers 1936 km in 35h 5m. The 12422/Amritsar–Hazur Sahib Nanded SuperFast Express has an average speed of 58 km/hr and covers 1936 km in 33h 15m .

Route and halts 

The important halts of the train are:

Coach composition

The train has standard ICF rakes with max speed of 110 kmph. The train consists of 18 coaches:

 1 AC II Tier
 2 AC III Tier
 7 Sleeper coaches
 6 General
 2 Seating cum Luggage Rake

Traction

Both trains are hauled by a Pune Loco Shed based WDM-3A diesel locomotive from Nanded to Akola. From Akola trains are hauled by a Bhusaval Loco Shed or Itarsi Loco Shed based WAP-4 electric locomotive until Amritsar and vice versa.

Direction reversal

The train reverses its direction 1 times:

Rake sharing

The train shares its rake with 14615/14616 Lalkuan–Amritsar Express.

See also 

 Hazur Sahib Nanded railway station
 Amritsar Junction railway station
 Lalkuan–Amritsar Express

Notes

References

External links 

 12421/Hazur Sahib Nanded - Amritsar SuperFast Express
 12422/Amritsar - Hazur Sahib Nanded SuperFast Express

Transport in Amritsar
Transport in Nanded
Express trains in India
Rail transport in Maharashtra
Rail transport in Madhya Pradesh
Rail transport in Uttar Pradesh
Rail transport in Delhi
Rail transport in Haryana
Rail transport in Punjab, India
Railway services introduced in 2015